Luis Humberto Velásquez (30 December 1919 – 9 February 1997) was a Guatemalan long-distance runner who competed in the 1952 Summer Olympics. He was third in the 1951 Pan American Games marathon and third in the 1955 Pan American Games marathon.

References

1919 births
1997 deaths
Guatemalan male long-distance runners
Guatemalan male marathon runners
Olympic athletes of Guatemala
Athletes (track and field) at the 1952 Summer Olympics
Pan American Games bronze medalists for Guatemala
Athletes (track and field) at the 1951 Pan American Games
Athletes (track and field) at the 1955 Pan American Games
Pan American Games medalists in athletics (track and field)
Central American and Caribbean Games gold medalists for Guatemala
Competitors at the 1950 Central American and Caribbean Games
Central American and Caribbean Games medalists in athletics
Medalists at the 1951 Pan American Games
Medalists at the 1955 Pan American Games
20th-century Guatemalan people